Alex Javier Comas Yacomelo (born 14 November 1971) is a Colombian former professional association football player. Throughout his career he has played in five countries and has even featured for the Colombia national team.

Biography

Playing career 
In preparation of the 2000 Major League Soccer season, then-MetroStars manager, Octavio Zambrano, was looking for a strike partner for Adolfo Valencia. After viewing a videotape of Comas, Zambrano invited the Colombian to join the MetroStars for training camp where he impressed enough to earn a contract. Comas quickly formed a partnership with Valencia in the MetroStars attack and the two opened the season by each scoring a goal against rival club, D.C. United in front of 27,322 fans at Giants Stadium.

International career 
Comas has made a few appearances for the Colombia national team. One of those appearances was against Paraguay in a friendly before the 1998 FIFA World Cup, though Comas was not named to the roster for the World Cup in France.

Career statistics

Footnotes

External links 
 
 Profile on MetroFanatic
 

1971 births
Living people
Footballers from Barranquilla
Association football forwards
Colombian footballers
Colombia international footballers
Independiente Medellín footballers
Atlético Junior footballers
Unión Magdalena footballers
Deportes Quindío footballers
América de Cali footballers
San Lorenzo de Almagro footballers
Atlético Nacional footballers
New York Red Bulls players
Carabobo F.C. players
Deportes Tolima footballers
Deportes La Serena footballers
Real Cartagena footballers
Santiago Morning footballers
Aragua FC players
Categoría Primera A players
Argentine Primera División players
Major League Soccer players
Colombian expatriate footballers
Expatriate footballers in Chile
Expatriate footballers in Argentina
Expatriate footballers in Venezuela
Expatriate soccer players in the United States
Colombian expatriate sportspeople in Chile
Colombian expatriate sportspeople in Argentina
Colombian expatriate sportspeople in Venezuela
Colombian expatriate sportspeople in the United States